Barry Barker is a British Contemporary Art curator and gallerist. He is head of the Centre for Contemporary Visual Arts at the University of Brighton. 

Previously, Barker worked with Nigel Greenwood and was exhibitions officer at the Institute of Contemporary Arts London and the John Hansard Gallery before becoming Director of the Arnolfini in Bristol 1986-1991 overseeing a refurbishment of the gallery. Following this, Barker was briefly with the South Bank Centre before becoming a Director of the Lisson Gallery. Barker's main areas of interest have been conceptual art and minimal and he had an influential role in many artists' careers of the last thirty years, especially Anish Kapoor. In 1986, he was co-curator of "Falls the Shadow" with Jon Thompson at the Hayward Gallery.

Recent publications
La costrucció de la vida de…/ The Making of the Life of... in El que vols que digui…Jo ja sóc mort/ What you want me to say… I'm already dead/ Lo que quieres que diga…Yoya estoy muerto. Edited by V.I. Brichs. Publisher: Fundació Joan Miró 2006, .
[re]imaging the world, the work of Jane and Louise Wilson in Jane and Louise Wilson. Editors: F. J. Panera. Publisher: Ediciones Universidad de Salamanca, 2003. .

Major exhibitions curated 
'Our Magic Hour (Ugo Rondinone)'. Photographic exhibition University of Brighton Gallery, 7 October – 2 November 2002.
David Austen film Crackers, the central feature of the David Austen exhibition at the Milton Keynes Gallery, 10 February – 23 March 2007.

References

External links
 Bio at University of Brighton

Living people
British curators
Year of birth missing (living people)